The paper hanger speech refers to an address by Cardinal George Mundelein to 500 priests of his Roman Catholic Archdiocese of Chicago, at the Archbishop Quigley Preparatory Seminary, in Chicago, Illinois, on May 18, 1937. In the speech he made observations on the transformation of German public opinion.

There is disagreement as to whether Adolf Hitler ever worked applying wallpaper or not. John Schimmel, a Wooster, Ohio man who grew up in Transylvania, claimed to have known Hitler at the time he was learning the trade. 

The paper hanger term was nonetheless pejorative, suggesting a laborer performing a task which required more hand–eye coordination than intellect, and one who offered ersatz art rather than original art. Accordingly, the term became popular among those who opposed Hitler's ideas rather than among those who endorsed them. 

Hitler retaliated by organizing a German family to contest the will of Fr. William Netstraeter, the deceased pastor of St. Joseph Catholic Church (Wilmette, Illinois) whose sum of $300,000 was currently being borrowed by Cardinal Mundelein to construct the University of St. Mary of the Lake. A Chicago circuit court eventually determined the will valid, and the funds were quickly used to construct the current church in Wilmette.

In Popular Culture

The phrase was used in the song "Springtime for Hitler" from the musical The Producers when the flamboyant Hitler begins a satirical monologue with the phrase: "I was just a paper hanger, no one more obscurer".

The story was featured in a documentary about Father Netstraeter, Cathedral of the North Shore, and in the book .

References

1937 speeches
Roman Catholic Archdiocese of Chicago
History of Illinois